St Peter's Church, Lutton is a Grade 1 Listed medieval church, which stands on the highest point in the village of Lutton, Northamptonshire, England. It is recorded in the National Heritage List for England as a designated Grade I listed building.  It is an active Anglican parish church in the Diocese of Peterborough, the Archdeaconry of Oakham and the deanery of Oundle.

History

The church originates from eleventh century, and was extended until the fifteenth century; with the North aisle added in the thirteenth century, the south aisle in the fourteenth Century, and the tower and clerestory dating from the fifteenth century.  The church was restored in the nineteenth century. Some masonry may have moved to St Peter's when the nearby church in Washingley was abandoned.

See also

Grade I listed buildings in Northamptonshire

References

Church of England church buildings in Northamptonshire
English Gothic architecture in Northamptonshire
15th-century church buildings in England
Anglican Diocese of Peterborough
Lutton